Syncytiotrophoblast (from the Greek 'syn'- "together"; 'cytio'- "of cells"; 'tropho'- "nutrition"; 'blast'- "bud") is the epithelial covering of the highly vascular embryonic placental villi, which invades the wall of the uterus to establish nutrient circulation between the embryo and the mother. It is a multinucleate, terminally differentiated syncytium, extending to 13cm.

Function

It is the outer layer of the trophoblasts and actively invades the uterine wall, during implantation, rupturing maternal capillaries and thus establishing an interface between maternal blood and embryonic extracellular fluid, facilitating passive exchange of material between the mother and the embryo.

The syncytial property is important since the mother's immune system includes white blood cells that are able to migrate into tissues by "squeezing" in between cells. If they were to reach the fetal side of the placenta many foreign proteins would be recognised, triggering an immune reaction. However the syncytium acts as a giant cell so there are no gaps for immune cells to migrate through.

One way in which it accomplishes this task is by suppressing the expression of immunity-related genes HLA-A and HLA-B, which are classically known to be expressed by all nucleated cells. These genes normally express the MHC-I ligand that acts as a major binding mechanism for T-cells. By decreasing the translation of these gene products, the syncytiotrophoblast reduces the chances of an attack by the maternal immune system mediated by T-cells.

The syncytiotrophoblast secretes progesterone and leptin in addition to human chorionic gonadotropin (hCG) and  human placental lactogen (HPL); hCG prevents degeneration of the corpus luteum. Progesterone serves to maintain the integrity of the uterine lining and, until the syncytiotrophoblast is mature enough to secrete enough progesterone to support pregnancy (in the fourth month of embryonic development), it is aided by the corpus luteum graviditatis.

Formation
The syncytiotrophoblast lacks proliferative capacity and instead is maintained by fusion of underlying cytotrophoblast cells. This fusion is assisted by syncytin, a protein that was integrated into mammalian genomes from an endogenous retrovirus.

Additional images

See also
 Cytotrophoblast
 Intermediate trophoblast
 Syncytium

References

Tony M. Plant, Anthony J. Zeleznik: "Knobil and Neill's Physiology of Reproduction: Two-Volume Set" p 1790

External links
  - "Female Reproductive System: placental villi"
 Nature (Journal) Diagram
  Article
 Diagram at McGill

Non-terminally differentiated (blast) cells
Embryology
Human female endocrine system